Qarah Veys is a village in Razavar Rural District, in the Central District of Kermanshah County, Kermanshah Province, Iran. At the 2006 census, its population was 27, in 5 families.

References 

Populated places in Kermanshah County